Pahonia ( – Pursuit)  is a Belarusian patriotic song based on the eponymous poem by Maksim Bahdanovič.

Background 
The poem Pahonia by Maksim Bahdanovič was written in 1916 in Minsk. It was later translated into English by Vera Rich.

During the interwar period, the youth of Western Belarus (at the time part of the Second Polish Republic) sang this poem to the tune of the French Marseillaise.

The music was written by Belarusian composer and immigrant activist Mikalay Shchahlou-Kulikovich, who in the 1950s and 1960s released five musical albums in the United States which included his own compositions, covers of ethnic Belarusian songs, and songs to the works of various Belarusian poets. The song was originally meant to be sung a capella. Mikola Ravienski,  and Vladimir Mulyavin also made covers of this song as well as other Belarusian musicians and bands. In the early 1990s, Shchahlou-Kulikovich’s version was considered as one of the options for the national anthem of the Republic of Belarus. In 2020, under the patronage of Anton Miaža a choral performance of the anthem was recorded with an orchestra accompaniment.

Usage 
In 2020, the anthem resurged in popularity as one of the symbols of the 2020 Belarusian protests against the Lukashenka regime, along with the white-red-white flag. The anthem was spontaneously performed in several public places: near the Belarusian State Philharmonic, in malls, in the Minsk subway, at the Minsk , and at the Minsk railway station.

Lyrics 
The poem “Pahonia” was written by Maksim Bahdanovič in the middle of WWI in 1916 in front-line wartime Minsk, Belarus. It was first published in the Belarusian newspaper “Free Belarus” (“Вольная Беларусь”) on 30 November 1917. 

The poem alludes to the history of the mighty medieval state, Grand Duchy of Lithuania (of which Belarus was part), its coat of arms “Pahonia” and the Gate of Dawn in Vilnius, which was the capital of that medieval state. Through the image and motif of the ancient Lithuanian Pahonia, the poet considers the contradictory present and the uncertain future of Belarus during World War I. “This is a poem-reflection, which is characterised by journalistic elements: the lyrical hero's appeals to “Pahonia”, to Belarus, the Motherland, many interrogative and exclamatory intonations.”  

When it is performed as an anthem, the last stanza is usually not sung, but the last lines of the second, fourth, and sixth stanza are sung twice.

See also 

Pahonia (coat of arms)
 Mahutny Boža (Almighty God)
 Freedom Day (Belarus)
 Vajacki marš
 Belarusian national revival

References

Bibliography 

 
 Музыкальное видео с текстом

Articles with unsourced statements from November 2020
Belarusian songs